is a Japanese tarento who is a former member of the female idol group SDN48.

Nachu grew up in Tokyo. She is represented with Watanabe Entertainment.

SDN48 discography

Singles
 SDN48

 AKB48

Stage units

Filmography

Variety

TV dramas

Stage

Bibliography

References

External links
  
 
 
 
 at Watanabe Entertainment 
 
 at Ameba Blog 
 at GREE 
 

Japanese television personalities
People from Toyonaka, Osaka
People from Tokyo
1984 births
Living people
Watanabe Entertainment